Weronika Nowakowska (born 7 July 1986) is a Polish biathlete.

Career
Nowakowska competed in the 2010 Winter Olympics for Poland. Her best performance was 5th in the individual, missing only one shot. Had she shot clear, her time would have placed her 2nd. She also finished 21st in the mass start, 36th in the sprint, 28th in the pursuit and 12th as part of the relay team.

As of February 2013, her best performance at the Biathlon World Championships, is 6th, as part of the 2009 Polish women's relay team. Her best individual performance is 9th, in the 2012 mass start.

As of February 2013, Nowakowska has finished on the podium once in the Biathlon World Cup, winning a bronze as part of the Polish women's relay team in Hochfilzen during the 2008/09 season. Her best individual performance is 7th, achieved twice in sprint races. Her best overall finish in the Biathlon World Cup is 24th, in 2011/12.

Biathlon results
All results are sourced from the International Biathlon Union.

Olympic Games
0 medals

*The mixed relay was added as an event in 2014.

World Championships
2 medals (1 silver, 1 bronze)

*During Olympic seasons competitions are only held for those events not included in the Olympic program.

World Cup Podiums

References

1986 births
Biathletes at the 2010 Winter Olympics
Biathletes at the 2014 Winter Olympics
Biathletes at the 2018 Winter Olympics
Polish female biathletes
Living people
Olympic biathletes of Poland
People from Kłodzko
Sportspeople from Lower Silesian Voivodeship
Biathlon World Championships medalists
Universiade medalists in biathlon
Universiade gold medalists for Poland
Universiade silver medalists for Poland
Competitors at the 2013 Winter Universiade
21st-century Polish women